Nuevo Milenio (English: New Millennium) is Hector & Tito's second studio album.

Track list 

Personnel 
All lyrics were provided by Héctor & Tito. Music was provided by Goldy except for track 11. José M. Lugo provided the music for that track.
Fred Tovar provided the acoustic guitar for tracks 4 and 7. He also provided the keyboards for track 6.

Charts

References

Héctor & Tito albums
2000 albums